The IOF .22 sporting rifle is a bolt-action .22 Long Rifle caliber rifle made by the Indian Ordnance Factory.
22 Sporting
.22" SPORTING RIFLE   Zoom

Calibre	.22 INCH L.R
Barrel Length	632 mm
Chamber	International standard L.R
(5.70 mm x 16.50 mm)
Groove	6 Nos. R.H. 1 Turn in 200 mm
Range	200 m Max.
Safety	On rear end top of the body by
turning lever safety
Trigger pull	Adjustable (Minimum 1 kg)
Weight of the Rifle	3 kg. Approx
Overall length	1092 mm
Furniture	Wooden
Magazine capacity	10 rounds
Weight	3 kg
 	 
Price (in Rupees)	 48,321/- (Incl. GST@18%)
SPECIAL FEATURES:
Cold swaged, Six grooved, Chrome-flashed barrel with International standard L.R. Chamber
Double action extraction mechanism provided for smooth extraction.
Adjustable Rear Sight with "Left-Right" adjustment.
Adjustable Fore-sight with "Hi-Lo" adjustment
Adjustment trigger pull .
Front sling loop position adjustable
Comfortable, smart looking, one piece Stock Butt satisfying U.I.T. specification
Safety catch positioned comfortably
Over body dovetail provided for Standard Peep Sight

References

Bolt-action rifles of India
.22 LR rifles